L'Accordée de Village is a painting by the French artist Jean-Baptiste Greuze, first exhibited at the 1761 Salon, where it was unanimously praised by the critics, notably by Diderot. It was the first example of the 'moral painting' genre, to which Greuze often returned. It is now in the Louvre Museum in Paris.

It was part of a series of 6 paintings. Caroline de Valory, a former pupil of Greuze, collaborated with the writer Alexandre Louis Bertrand Robineau to produce L'Accordée de Village, a one-act comedy based on the paintings.

Bibliography
Denis Diderot, Salon de 1765, Hermann, Paris, 1984
Denis Diderot, Héros et martyrs, Hermann, Paris, 1995
Denis Diderot, Essais sur la peinture, Salons de 1759, 1761, 1763, Hermann, Paris, 2007
Edgar Munhall, Jean-Baptiste Greuze 1728–1805, catalogue of an exhibition at the Wadsworth Atheneum, Hartford, 1977

Paintings in the Louvre by French artists
1761 paintings
Paintings by Jean-Baptiste Greuze